Carl Roaches (born October 2, 1953) is a former American football wide receiver and kick returner in the NFL who played for the Houston Oilers (1980–1984) and New Orleans Saints (1985). He went to the Pro Bowl after the 1981 season.

See also
Most consecutive games played by a return specialist

1953 births
Living people
Sportspeople from Houston
American football wide receivers
American football return specialists
Texas A&M Aggies football players
Houston Oilers players
New Orleans Saints players
American Conference Pro Bowl players
Players of American football from Houston